Klíma is a Czech family name, female counterpart Klímová, anglicized as Klima. Notable people with the surname include:

Klíma 
 Ivan Klíma, Czech author
 Jiří Klíma, Czech footballer
 Josef Klíma, Czech basketball player
 Ladislav Klíma (1878–1928), Czech philosopher and novelist
 Linda Klímová (born 1988), Czech curler
 Ludvík Klíma (1912–1973), Czech sprint canoeist
 Lukáš Klíma, Czech curler
 Lukáš Klíma, Slovak ice hockey player
 Matěj Klíma, Czech handball player
 Petr Klíma (born 1964), Czech ice hockey player
 Rita Klímová (1931–1993), Czech dissident and ambassador to the United States
 Vilém Klíma (1906–1985), Czech electrical engineer
 Vlastimil Klíma (born 1957), Czech cryptographer

Klima
 Edward Klima (1931–2008), American linguist
 Johann Klima (1900–1945), Austrian footballer
 John Klima (artist) (born 1965), American new media artist
 John Klima (editor) (born 1971), American science fiction magazine editor
 Martha Scanlan Klima, (born 1939), American politician
 Mita Klima (1893–1945), Austrian tennis player
 Viktor Klima (born 1947), former Austrian chancellor

See also
A village on the island of Milos, Greece; see Klima (village)
Klima Tropiko (Greek: Κλίμα Τροπικό; English: Tropical Climate) a Greek album by singer Anna Vissi

Czech-language surnames

External links
vrf Klima sistemleri